Kodeeswari was a Tamil quiz show which aired on Colors Tamil from Monday to Friday at 8 pm. It is the Indian Tamil women's edition of Who Wants to Be a Millionaire?. It was started on 23 December 2019. It was hosted by Raadhika Sarathkumar

History 
In 2019, the show was restarted from Neengalum Vellalam Oru Kodi to Kodeeswari. This season was the first in India where a woman became the host, and was the first version in the world where only women were allowed to sign up as contestants.

Time Limit 
In this season, every contestant had a clock. For the answers of 1st to 5th questions. The contestants had 45 seconds to answer 6th to 10th questions. The contestant was given 60 seconds if the contestant successfully answered the 10th question, they could answer 11-15 questions. In the meantime, the clock would be disappeared, and the player could think for an unlimited amount of time.

Lifelines 

 Audience Poll (பார்வையாளர் கருத்துக்கணிப்பு):- If any contestant would use this lifeline, the host would repeat the question to the audience. The studio audience would get 10 seconds to answer the question. Audience members would use touchpads to give the answer what they believe. After the audience would have chosen their choices, their choices would be displayed to the contestant in percentages in bar-graph format and also shown on the monitors screens of the host and contestant, as well as the TV viewers.
 50:50:- If the contestant would use this lifeline, the host would ask the computer to remove two of the wrong answers. This would remain one right answer and one wrong answer. This would help a contestant giving 50% chance of answering the correct answer.
 Ask The Expert (நிபுணரிடம் கேளுங்கள்):- If the contestant would use this lifeline, the contestant would be allowed to call the selected expert. The host would usually be started off by talking to the expert and introduces him/her to the viewers at the first of the show.
 Flip A Question (ஒரு கேள்வியை புரட்டவும்):- When a contestant would use this lifeline, the computer would replace the current question with another one of the same monetary value. However, any lifelines used on the original question are not reinstated, and the contestant could not return to the original question, as the computer will reveal the correct answer to the old question before replacing it.

Money Tree

Winners

₹1,00,00,000/- Winners 

 Kousalya Kharthika (21 January 2020)

₹25,00,000/- Winners 

 Mahalakshmi (3 January 2020)

₹12,50,000/- Winners 

 Vallikannu (23 December 2019)
 Kubbulakshmi Kumutha (30 December 2019)
 Eshwari (10 January 2020)
 Varalaxmi Sarathkumar and Sarathkumar Ramanathan (13 January 2020)

₹6,40,000/- Winners 

 Chandini (24 December 2019)
 Gowthami (25 December 2019)
 Devi Shree (1 January 2020)
 Pradeepa (9 January 2020)
 Radha (14 January 2020)
 Ramya Krishnan (15 January 2020)

₹3,20,000/- Winners 

 Swetha (27 December 2019)
 Vasanthi G (31 December 2019)
 Balapushpa (7 January 2020)
 Abinaya (8 January 2020)

₹1,60,000/- Winners 

 Meena (27 December 2019)
 Sree Geetha (2 January 2019)

₹40,000/- Winners 

 Darshu (14 December 2019)
 Angeline (26 December 2019)

₹10,000/- Winners 

 Archana Devi (6 January 2020)
 Susmitha (7 January 2020)

₹0/- Winners 

 Uma Maheswari (31 December 2019)

References 

Indian reality television series
Indian game shows
Who Wants to Be a Millionaire?
2018 Indian television series debuts
Indian television series based on British television series